Shahrak-e Azadi may refer to:
 Shahrak-e Azadi, Ahvaz
 Shahrak-e Azadi, Andimeshk
 Shahrak-e Azadi, Omidiyeh
 Shahrak-e Azadi, Ramshir